The following list is a discography of production by Juicy J, an American hip hop record producer and recording artist from Memphis, Tennessee. It includes a list of songs produced, co-produced and remixed by year, artist, album and title. For the Three 6 Mafia and Hypnotize Minds projects Juicy J produced music alongside his Three Six Mafia cohort DJ Paul and in more recent years Crazy Mike.

Albums produced

1994

Triple 6 Mafia - Smoked Out, Loced Out 

 All tracks (produced with DJ Paul)

1995

Three 6 Mafia - Mystic Stylez 

 All tracks (produced with DJ Paul)

1996

Kingpin Skinny Pimp - King of da Playaz Ball 

 All tracks (produced with DJ Paul)

Kingpin Skinny Pimp - Skinny but Dangerous 

 All tracks (produced with DJ Paul)

Gangsta Blac - Can it Be 

 All tracks (produced with DJ Paul)

Three 6 Mafia - Chapter 1: The End 

 All tracks (produced with DJ Paul)

1997

Three 6 Mafia - Chapter 2: World Domination 

 All tracks (produced with DJ Paul)

1998

Prophet Posse - Body Parts 

 All tracks (produced with DJ Paul)

Indo G - Angel Dust
All Tracks (produced with DJ Paul)

The Kaze - Kamakazie Timez Up 

 All tracks (produced with DJ Paul)

Gangsta Boo - Enquiring Minds 

 All tracks (produced with DJ Paul)

1999

Project Pat - Ghetty Green
All Tracks (produced with DJ Paul) except "Choppers"

Tear Da Club Up Thugs - CrazyNDaLazDayz
All Tracks (produced with DJ Paul) 
14. "Hypnotize Cash Money" (produced with DJ Paul and Mannie Fresh)

2000

Hypnotize Camp Posse - Three 6 Mafia Presents: Hypnotize Camp Posse

 All Tracks (produced with DJ Paul) except "Big Mouth, Big Talk"

Three 6 Mafia - When the Smoke Clears: Sixty 6, Sixty 1 

 All tracks (produced with DJ Paul)

Triple Six Mafia -  Kings Of Memphis Underground Vol. 3

 All Tracks (produced with DJ Paul)

Funkmaster Flex - 60 Minutes Of Funk, Volume IV: The Mixtape
22. "Break Da Law 2001" (Project Pat and Three 6 Mafia)  (produced with DJ Paul)

2001

Project Pat - Mista Don't Play: Everythangs Workin
All Tracks (produced with DJ Paul)

Gangsta Boo - Both Worlds *69 

 All tracks (produced with DJ Paul)

La Chat - Murder She Spoke
All Tracks (produced with DJ Paul)

Three 6 Mafia - Choices: The Album
All Tracks (produced with DJ Paul)

2002

Juicy J - Chronicles of the Juice Man
All Tracks

Project Pat - Layin' da Smack Down
All Tracks (produced with DJ Paul)

Da Headbussaz - Dat's How It Happen to'M 

 All tracks (produced with DJ Paul except track 10, produced by Fiend.)

2003

Lil Wyte - Doubt Me Now 

 All tracks (produced with DJ Paul)

Frayser Boy - Gone on That Bay 

 All tracks (produced with DJ Paul)

Project Pat - Mix Tape: The Appeal
All Tracks (produced with DJ Paul)

Three 6 Mafia - Da Unbreakables 

 All tracks (produced with DJ Paul)

Ludacris - Chicken-n-Beer
7. "Diamond In The Back" (produced with DJ Paul)
16. "We Got" (featuring Chingy, I-20 and 2 Chainz) (produced with DJ Paul)

2004

Goodie Mob - One Monkey Don't Stop No Show 

 3. "123 Goodie" (produced with DJ Paul)

Young Buck - Straight Outta Cashville
12. "Stomp" (featuring T.I. and Ludacris) (produced with DJ Paul)
13. "Taking Hits" (featuring D-Tay) (produced with DJ Paul)

I-20 - Self Explanatory
8. "Hennessey & Hydro" (featuring Three 6 Mafia) (produced with DJ Paul)

Lil Wyte - Phinally Phamous 

 All tracks (produced with DJ Paul)

2005

Three 6 Mafia - Choices II: The Setup 

 All tracks (produced with DJ Paul)

Three 6 Mafia - Most Known Unknown 

 All tracks (produced with DJ Paul)

Mike Jones - Who Is Mike Jones? 

 5. "Got It Sewed Up" (Remix) (produced with DJ Paul)

Paul Wall - The Peoples Champ 

 1. "I'm a Playa" (featuring Three 6 Mafia) (produced with DJ Paul)

2006

DJ Kay Slay and Greg Street - The Champions: North Meets South
"Hood Drug Warz" (featuring B.G., Lil Wyte & Three 6 Mafia) (produced with DJ Paul)

Blak Jak - Roll Da Dice
"Get Right Or Get Left"  (produced with DJ Paul)

Crunchy Black - On My Own 

 All tracks  (produced with DJ Paul)

Lil Scrappy - Bred 2 Die, Born 2 Live 

 7. "Posted in the Club" (featuring Three 6 Mafia)  (produced with DJ Paul)

Project Pat - Crook by da Book: The Fed Story 

 All tracks  (produced with DJ Paul)

2007

Lil' Flip - I Need Mine 

 15. "I Just Wanna Tell U" (produced with DJ Paul)
 28. "3, 2, 1, Go!" (featuring Three 6 Mafia) (produced with DJ Paul)

Lil Wyte - The One and Only 

 All tracks (produced with DJ Paul)

Crunchy Black - From Me to You 

 All tracks (produced with DJ Paul)

UGK - Underground Kingz
"Int'l Players Anthem (I Choose You)"  (featuring OutKast) (produced with DJ Paul)

Project Pat - Walkin' Bank Roll 

 All tracks (produced with DJ Paul)

2008

Three 6 Mafia - Last 2 Walk 

 All tracks (produced with DJ Paul)
 6. "I'd Rather" (featuring UNK) (produced with DJ Montay)
 7. "That's Right" (featuring Akon) (produced with Akon and Giorgio Tuinfort)
 16. "My Own Way" (featuring Good Charlotte) (produced with Dead Executives)
 21. "Lolli Lolli (Pop That Body)" (featuring Project Pat, Superpower & Young D) (produced with Superpower)
 22. "My Own Way (Remix)" (featuring Good Charlotte) (produced with Dead Executives)

2009

Project Pat - Real Recognize Real 

 All tracks (produced with DJ Paul)

Juicy J - Hustle Til I Die 

 All tracks

Lil Wyte - The Bad Influence 

 All tracks (produced with DJ Paul)

Freddie Gibbs - Midwestgangstaboxframecadillacmuzik 

 15. "Just Tryin' ta Make It" (produced with DJ Paul)

Lil B - 6 Kiss 

 22. "Smoke Trees Fxxx Hoes" (produced with DJ Paul)

2011

SNO - Year Round 

 All tracks (produced with DJ Paul)

Juicy J and Lex Luger - Rubba Band Business 2
5. "Durr She Go" (featuring Travis Porter) (produced with Billy Wes and Teezio)
9. "Stoner's Night" (produced with Teezio)

Project Pat - Loud Pack 

 All tracks (produced with DJ Paul)

Ludacris - 1.21 Gigawatts: Back to the First Time
7. "Say It to My Face" (featuring Meek Mill)

Juicy J - Blue Dream & Lean 
2. "Drugged Out" (produced with Lex Luger)
4. "Errbody Wave"
9. "Lucky Charm" (produced with Crazy Mike)
13. "Got A New One" (produced with Crazy Mike)
20. "Gotta Stay Strapped" (featuring Alley Boy and Project Pat)
25. "Deez Bitches Rollin'" (featuring SpaceGhostPurrp and Speakz)

2012

Hodgy Beats - Untitled EP 
1. "Bullshittin"

Lil B - God's Father 

 8. "Keep It 100" (produced with DJ Paul)

Future - Pluto
6. "I'm Trippin'" (featuring Juicy J)

Juicy J - Blue Dream & Lean (Bonus Tracks) 
1. "I Won't Miss Ya"
8. "Codine Cups" (produced with Crazy Mike)

Berner - Urban Farmer 

 16. "Fly As Us" (featuring Juicy J and Bei Maejor) (produced with Crazy Mike)

Nicki Minaj - Pink Friday: Roman Reloaded – The Re-Up
6. "I Endorse These Strippers" (featuring Tyga and Brinx) (produced with Crazy Mike)

2013

Lil Wayne - I Am Not a Human Being II 
4. "Gunwalk" (featuring Gudda Gudda) (produced with Crazy Mike)
7. "Trigger Finger" (featuring Soulja Boy) (produced with Crazy Mike)
10. "Trippy" (featuring Juicy J) (produced with Crazy Mike)

Funkmaster Flex - Who You Mad At? Me or Yourself? 

 34. "Want Some Have Some" (featuring Juicy J)

DJ Scream - The Ratchet Superior EP 

 3. "Come Up Off Of That" (featuring Juicy J, Migos and Project Pat) (produced with Crazy Mike)

Wale - The Gifted
9. "Clappers" (featuring Nicki Minaj and Juicy J) (produced with Mark Henry Beats, No Credit and Kane Beatz)

Juicy J - Stay Trippy
2. "Smokin' Rollin" (featuring Pimp C) (produced with Crazy Mike)
4. "So Much Money" (produced with Crazy Mike and Lex Luger)
6. "Wax" (produced with Crazy Mike)
7. "Gun Plus a Mask" (featuring Yelawolf) (produced with Crazy Mike)
11. "Money a Do It" (produced with Crazy Mike)

2014

Wiz Khalifa - 28 Grams
15. "Word on the Town" (featuring Juicy J and Pimp C) (produced with Lil Awree and Crazy Mike)

Lil Bibby - Free Crack 2
7. "Montana" (featuring Juicy J) (produced with Lil Awree and Crazy Mike)

2015

Juicy J - Blue Dream & Lean 2
2. "Stoners Night" (produced with Lil Awree and Crazy Mike)
8. "Denna Bitch" (featuring Project Pat) (produced with Lil Awree and Crazy Mike)
10. "All I Need" (featuring K Camp) (produced with Big Fruit, Lil Awree, and Crazy Mike)
12. "Don't" (produced with Lil Awree and Crazy Mike)
14. "Do It To Em" (featuring Elle Varner) (produced with Crazy Mike and Lil Awree)
15. "Deep Down South" (featuring Project Pat) (produced with Crazy Mike and Lil Awree)

Project Pat - Mista Don't Play 2: Everythangs Money 

 1. "Tunnel Vision" (produced with Lil Awree)
 2. "Pull a Move" (produced with Crazy Mike)
 3. "Gooned Up" (featuring Bankroll Fresh) (produced with Lil Awree)
 4. "I Ain't Payem Shit" (produced with Lil Awree)
 5. "Crash Out" (produced with Lil Awree)
 6. "I Like to Smokeaaaa" (produced with Crazy Mike)
 11. "Twerk It" (featuring Ty Dolla $ign, Wiz Khalifa and Wale) (produced with K.E. on the Track and Lil Awree)
 13. "Gucci Skully" (featuring King Ray) (produced with Lil Awree)
 14. "Suspect" (featuring Donvito) (produced with Lil Awree)
 16. "Trying To Get a Dollar" (produced with Lil Awree)
 17. "Makin Plays" (produced with Lil Awree and Deezy)

A$AP Rocky - At. Long. Last. ASAP 

 12. "Wavybone" (featuring Juicy J and UGK)

Juicy J - 100% Juice
5. "Ain't No Rapper" (featuring Lil Herb) (produced with Lil Awree and Crazy Mike)

Juicy J - O's To Oscars 

 6. "Disrespectin" (featuring DC Young Fly) (produced with Lex Luger, Lil Awree and Crazy Mike)

2016

Wiz Khalifa - Khalifa 

 6. "Bake Sale" (featuring Travis Scott) (produced with TM88, Lex Luger, DJ Spinz, and Crazy Mike)

Juicy J - Lit in Ceylon 

 16. "Road To Sri Lanka" (produced with Crazy Mike)

Taylor Gang - TGOD, Volume 1 

 5. "Feeling Faded" (produced with Lil Awree and Crazy Mike)

DRAM - Big Baby DRAM 

 22. "Gilligan" (featuring ASAP Rocky and Juicy J) (produced with DRAM)

2017

Desiigner
"Up"

Juicy J - Gas Face 

 8. "Focus" (produced with Crazy Mike)

2018

Juicy J - SHUTDAFUKUP 

 19. "Malia OG" (produced with Crazy Mike)

Henry AZ - Just Another PhAZe 

 7. "Backwood and Blue Dream" (featuring Juicy J) (produced with Crazy Mike)

YKOM - 901 Drip 

 11. "Built (Like That)" (produced with YK808 and Doughboy)

Suicideboys - I Want to Die in New Orleans
6. "Phantom Menace"

2019

Megan Thee Stallion - Fever 

 3. "Pimpin" (produced with Suede and Crazy Mike)
 7. "Simon Says" (featuring Juicy J) (produced with Suede and Crazy Mike)
 10. "Dance" (produced with Crazy Mike)

Megan Thee Stallion 
 “Hot Girl Summer”

French Montana - MONTANA 

 3. "50's & 100's" (featuring Juicy J)
 13. "Twisted" (featuring Juicy J, Logic, and ASAP Rocky)

Ty Dolla Sign 
 “Hottest In The City”

2020

Duke Deuce - Memphis Massacre 2 

 3. "Crunk Ain't Dead [Remix]" (featuring Project Pat, Lil Jon, and Juicy J) (produced with DJ Paul)

Duki - 24 

 "24" (featuring Kidd Keo) (produced with Club Hats, Bone Collector, and Ciaga)

IDK - IDK & FRIENDS 2 

 8. "495" (featuring Rico Nasty, Big Flock, Big Jam, and Weensey) (produced with IDK and Acyde)

Young Dolph - Rich Slave 

 3. "To Be Honest"
 10. "RNB" (featuring Megan Thee Stallion) (produced with Sosa808)

T.I. - The L.I.B.R.A. 

 8. "Hypno" (featuring Rahky)

Megan Thee Stallion - Good News 

 7. "Freaky Girls" (featuring SZA)
 10. "Work That" 
 14. "Outside"

Juicy J - The Hustle Continues 

 All tracks
 2. "Gah Damn High" (featuring Wiz Khalifa) (produced with Lex Luger)
 8. "1995" (featuring Logic) (produced with 6ix)
 11. "Load It Up" (featuring NLE Choppa) (produced with Taz Taylor, Pharaoh Vice, and DT)
 12. "She Gon Pop It" (featuring Megan Thee Stallion and Ty Dolla Sign) (produced with TrapMoneyBenny)

2021

Megan Thee Stallion - Something for Thee Hotties 

 1. "Tuned In Freestyle" (produced with Romano)
 4. "Southside Forever Freestyle" (produced with LilJuMadeDaBeat)
 18. "Pipe Up"

Chief Keef - 4NEM 

 13. "Hadouken" (produced with DJ Paul)

2022

Duke Deuce - Crunkstar 

 16. "Flip da Switch" (featuring Juicy J) (produced with Pliznaya)

Megan Thee Stallion - Traumazine 

 17. "Southside Royalty Freestyle" (featuring Sauce Walka, Big Pokey and Lil' Keke)

References

See also 
DJ Paul production discography

Discographies of American artists
Hip hop discographies
Production discographies